Carius is a genus of thrips in the family Phlaeothripidae. It is monotypic, being represented by the single species Carius malgassus.

References

Phlaeothripidae